David Casals-Roma (13 October 1972 - Lleida, Spain) is a Spanish writer/director based in Spain.

He moved to Amsterdam in 1997 and began learning the intricacies of the film business whilst working as an IT technician. His first experience as a filmmaker came two years later, when he moved to Brussels where he shot his first two short films.

In 2001, he moved to London where he studied a BA in Film and Media at Birkbeck, University of London. He also enrolled in different screenwriting and directing courses in Spain, United Kingdom, France, The Netherlands, Italy and the United States.

David has directed short films, documentaries and has written several feature film scripts. He has won over 100 awards worldwide and works as a screenwriting and directing teacher at different film schools in Spain, France and the United States. Besides filmmaking, he has written novels, short stories, theatre plays and poetry, and has published a novel titled 21 days of rage. He speaks fluent Catalan, Spanish, English, French and Italian.

In 2019 he started ECCIT, a film school in Lleida (Spain) with the main goal of training future filmmakers.

References

External links
 
 
 ECCIT

Spanish film directors
1972 births
Alumni of Birkbeck, University of London
Living people